LY-341495 is a research drug developed by the pharmaceutical company Eli Lilly, which acts as a potent and selective orthosteric antagonist for the group II metabotropic glutamate receptors (mGluR2/3).

It is used in scientific research in several different areas, showing antidepressant effects in animal models, increasing the behavioural effects of hallucinogenic drugs in animal tests, and increasing the analgesic effects of μ-opioid agonists, as well as modulating dopamine receptor function.

The 1-fluorocyclopropane analog has a superior pharmacokinetic profile and similar mGluR2/3 affinity, and making a prodrug from this with the heptyl ester increases bioavailability still further.

See also 
 CECXG

References 

Eli Lilly and Company brands
MGlu2 receptor antagonists
MGlu3 receptor antagonists
Xanthenes